Tangle may refer to:

Science, Technology, Engineering & Mathematics 
The Tangle is the name of the ledger, a directed acyclic graph, used for the cryptocurrency IOTA
Tangle (mathematics), a topological object

Natural sciences & medicine 
Sea tangle, another name for kelp
Neurofibrillary tangles, which occur in Alzheimer's disease

Music 
Tangle (album), a 1989 album by Thinking Fellers Union Local 282
Tangle (EP), a 2016 extended play by Trash Talk
Tangles (album), a 2005 album by S. J. Tucker

Social media 
tangle.com, a Christian social networking site

Fiction 
Tangle (TV series), an Australian television series
Tangle, a character in The Golden Key by George MacDonald
The Tangle is a 2019 sci-fi film by  Christopher Soren Kelly.
Tangle the Lemur, a character from IDW Publishing comic series Sonic the Hedgehog
"Tangles", a Hugo Award-nominated story by Seanan McGuire

See also
 Tangled (disambiguation)
 Knot
 Rectangle